Crater Lakes is a national park in Far North Queensland, Queensland, Australia, 1367 km northwest of Brisbane. The park contains two volcanically-formed lakes, Lake Barrine and Lake Eacham (Yidyam). Both lakes have walking trails around the lake; boat tours are also given at Lake Barrine.

One of the recognizable features of the park are giant bull kauri pine trees (Agathis australis).

The average elevation of the terrain is 729 meters.

History 
In 1934, the Queensland Government created Lake Barrine National Park and Lake Eacham National Park. In 1994, the Queensland Government merged Lake Barrine National Park and Lake Eacham National Park to form Crater Lakes National Park.

References

See also

 Protected areas of Queensland

National parks of Far North Queensland
Protected areas established in 1994